William Henry Greer (28 February 1872 – 1937) was an English footballer who played in the Football League for Darwen and Preston North End.

References

1872 births
1937 deaths
English footballers
Association football defenders
English Football League players
Darwen F.C. players
Preston North End F.C. players